A social forum is an open meeting place for civil society organizations and individuals opposed to neoliberalism and what its participants regard as the domination of the world by capital and imperialism. The first social forum was the World Social Forum (WSF) held in January 2001 in Porto Alegre. It was designed as a counter forum to the World Economic Forum (WEF) held in Davos at the same time. While the WSF regards the WEF as a meeting of the political and economic elite of the world, the WSF gathers social forces and aims to promotes democratization and social justice.

After the first WSF, the social forum idea was replicated across the world in various transnational, national, and local social forums. Most, though not all, social forums adhere to the WSF Charter of Principles, drawn up by the International Council of the WSF. The diversity of participants in the social forums has reflected the diversity of the Global Justice Movement (or Anti-Globalization Movement).

Transnational social forums 

African Social Forum
Americas Social Forum
Asian Social Forum
European Social Forum (ESF)
Mediterranean Social Forum
Pan-amazon Social Forum
Southern Africa Social Forum
World Social Forum

National social forums 

Austrian Social Forum
Belgian Social Forum
Belarusian Social Forum
Danish Social Forum
Finnish Social Forum
German Social Forum
Greek Social Forum
Hungarian Social Forum
Norwegian Social Forum
Romanian Social Forum
Swiss Social Forum
Thai Social Forum
Turkish Social Forum
United States Social Forum

Local and regional social forums

Germany 
Berlin Social Forum
Bremen Social Forum
Bochum Social Forum
Erlangen Social Forum
Freiburg Social Forum
Heidelberg Social Forum
Leipzig Social Forum
Pforzheim Social Forum
Reutlingen Social Forum
Saar Social Forum
Tübingen Social Forum

Great Britain 
Cardiff Social Forum
Liverpool Social Forum
London Social Forum
Manchester Social Forum
Sheffield Social Forum

India 
Social forums in India include:
India Institute for Critical Action: Centre in Movement

Italy 
Social forums in Italy include:
Genoa Social Forum

Sweden 
Social forums in Sweden include:
Gothenburg Social Forum
Gävle Social Forum
Skåne Social Forum
Stockholm Social Forum
Umeå Social Forum
Uppsala Social Forum

United States 
Boston Social Forum
Midwest Social Forum
Southeast Social Forum
Local to Global Justice Teach-in

Thematic social forums 
Social Forum of Architecture

See also
World Social Forum
Social Forums

References 

Anti-capitalism
Globalization
Justice
Social movements
Political congresses

de:Sozialforum
fr:Forum social